Hŭich'ŏn is a city in the southern part of Chagang Province, North Korea.  The population is 168,180 (2008 data).

History
The region surrounding the city became Huichon County in 1896. It was originally part of North Pyongan province during the Japanese colonial era. The county was originally divided into nine myons and 35 dongs at the time of the establishment of the newly created Chagang Province in January 1947, but the part of the eastern regions of the county break out of the administrative division to form Tongsin County in 1952. In October 1967, the county was promoted to city status. Huichon was formerly a small village. Since the Korean War and an influx of government investment, it has become a base for electronics and machinery production for North Korea. The region was particularly affected by the North Korean famine of the 1990s. Today, Huichon hosts the main University of Telecommunications of North Korea.

Administrative divisions
Hŭich'ŏn is divided into 21 tong (neighbourhoods) and 12 ri (villages):

Transportation
Hŭich'ŏn is served by an express highway to Pyongyang and by the Manpo Line railway.

Huichon has a 7 km long trolleybus line, which received new Chollima-321 trolleybuses in 2019 or 2020.

Economy
The major industries are automotive and machinery manufacturing, including the Huichon Machine Tool Factory, Huichon Silk Mill and Huichon Hard Glassware Factory. Because of its strategic inland location, Hŭich'ŏn is also a site for ordnance manufacturing.

Huichon Machine Tool Factory
The Korea General Machinery Trading Corporation operates the Huichon Machine Tool Factory, North Korea's government-run manufacturer of heavy-duty machine tools for domestic use and for export (although most exports are blocked by UN embargoes).

The factory group was founded in 1955 and is involved in machine tool production processes including steel-making, casting, processing, assembly, painting and packing. Products are produced on a serial basis and a small lot basis; its output of precision machine tools includes an assortment of spline-grinding machines and industrial lathes.

The creation of the complex was firstly discussed in a March 1951 Workers' Party of Korea Central Committee meeting. Kim Il Sung said "In the course of the war, I have learned a bloody lesson that we should produce our own munitions and weapons. I keenly feel that we must have a solid machine-building industry in a far-sighted way." Two locations were cited for this purpose: Tokchon and Huichon.

Once built, the factory became a model for the machine-building industry of the country. Machine factories have been built in Taean, Ragwon, Tokchon, Ryongsong, Kusong and other parts of the country were built on the Hŭich'ŏn model. According to questionable DPRK government figures, (as of 1998) machine-building industry in North Korea had increased 1690 times compared with the pre-liberation figure, and its self-sufficiency in machinery was already 98 per cent.

Huichon Silk Mill
The Huichon Silk Mill is a state-run factory which produces silk thread, renowned as a Korean specialty since antiquity. Work was completed on the building in September 1988. It was constructed on the bank of the Chongchon River.

The team charged with the initial process of silk thread production sort the cocoons and remove cocoons with decayed chrysalises in them. Government mandates are strict: the cocoon-boiling and silk-reeling workteams must strive to increase thread production. The machinists of the cocoon-boiling workteams must "raise the actual utility rate" by rationally regulating the temperature in boiling cocoons.

At the silk reeling workshop, the workers in charge of finding the ends of cocoon threads must examine all the ends of cocoon threads to ensure there is no waste. The silk reelers are responsible for many pots, and must meet goals by "raising their technological level" and surpassing their monthly production plans.

The Chongchongang-brand silk threads have been exported to many countries, although UN embargoes have crippled the silk trade in recent years.

Huichon Hard Glassware Factory
The Huichon Hard Glassware Factory consists of the main building, and supplementary one on an area of about 12,000 square metres. It can annually produce over ten million glassware of different kinds.

The facility has a glass fusion furnace, a press-plastic machine, a centrifugal plastic machine, and many raw materials.

The factory produces various kinds of glassware for home use. They are supplied to households in Pyongyang, Chagang Province and other parts of the country.

Hydroelectric power
Huichon contains a number of small hydroelectric power plants surrounding it as well as a major hydroelectric plant (Huichon No. 2) which was completed in April 2012, seven years ahead of schedule. Its main purpose is to supply steady electricity to Pyongyang (175 km to the southeast). It has a power generation capacity of about 300 MWe.

In December 2012, a report surfaced that the Huichon No. 2 Power Station had severe structural problems and was leaking. The problems are so large that Pyongyang now receives as little as five hours of electricity a day. According to the Radio Free Asia report, an anti-communist radio keep by United States, "Only the Kim idolization facilities, apartments for Central Party officials, the [43-story] Koryo Hotel and [the new] Changjeon St. [housing development] have 24-hour electricity, while the districts where ordinary people live can only use electricity for five hours a day."

A South Korean news source, The Chosun Ilbo, also reported that when Kim Jong-il learned of the problems, he flew into a fit of rage, ordered severe punishments for those involved and subsequently died from a heart attack as a result.

Climate
Huichon has a humid continental climate (Köppen climate classification: Dwa).

See also

Administrative divisions of North Korea
Geography of North Korea

References

 Panorama Korea, Foreign Language Publishing House, Pyongyang, 1999.

Further reading
Dormels, Rainer. North Korea's Cities: Industrial facilities, internal structures and typification. Jimoondang, 2014.

External links

Foreign Trade
City profile of Huichon 

Cities in Chagang